Attakoya Thangal Marine Reserve is the world's second marine conservation reserve for the most endangered Sea cucumbers. It was announced by the Lakshadweep Islands Administration in February 2020. This reserve covers an area of about 344 sq. km and lies between Amini and Pitti archipelago. This came into action when the smuggling of such rare species was reported. More than 1,716 sea cucumbers were seized by the administration in an desolate island named Suhali. These rare species are in great demand for medicines & food in South-east countries like China. This conservation reserve comprises [lagoons and coral formations which acts as a breeding ground for diversity of species.

References 

Marine conservation
Protected areas